This is a list of events that took place in 2010 related to British television.

Events

January

February

March

April

May

June

July

August

September

October

November

December

Debuts

BBC

ITV

Channel 4

Five

Other channels

Channels

New channels

Defunct channels

Rebranded channels

Changes of network affiliation

Television shows

Returning this year after a break of one year or longer

Continuing television shows

1920s

1930s

1950s

1960s

1970s

1980s

1990s

2000s

Ending this year

Deaths

See also
 2010 in British music
 2010 in British radio
 2010 in the United Kingdom
 List of British films of 2010

References